Edward Nelson Cole (born Charlotte, North Carolina, March 29, 1937) is a former Democratic member of the North Carolina General Assembly. A resident of Reidsville, North Carolina, he represented the state's sixty-fifth House district, which includes constituents in Rockingham County, for eight terms.

A graduate of the University of South Carolina (1962), Cole worked as a manager for Ford Motor Company until becoming an auto dealer in 1980. Cole has been active on transportation-related issues, sponsoring a bicycle safety law and being a member of several national transportation groups - the State Automotive Enthusiast Leadership Council and the National Conference of State Legislatures standing committee on transportation. As of the 2009-2010 session, he was the co-chairman of the legislature's Joint Legislative Transportation Oversight Committee.

Cole was defeated for re-election to his House seat by conservative independent candidate Bert Jones on November 2, 2010. In the 2012 election, Cole is running to attempt a comeback and return to his former seat.

References 

Nelson Cole Campaign site
Rep. Cole Vote History

External links

|-

|-

Members of the North Carolina House of Representatives
Living people
1937 births
21st-century American politicians
University of South Carolina alumni